16 Biggest Hits is a 2006 Johnny Cash and June Carter Cash compilation album. It is part of a series of similar 16 Biggest Hits albums released by Legacy Recordings.  It has sold 333,000 copies in the US as of May 2013. It was also released under the title June Carter and Johnny Cash: Duets.

Track listing

Chart performance
16 Biggest Hits peaked at #26 on the U.S. Billboard Top Country Albums chart in 2006 and #126 on the Billboard 200.

References

Cash, Johnny and Cash, June Carter
Johnny Cash compilation albums
June Carter Cash compilation albums
2006 greatest hits albums
Split albums